The 2001 Women's National Invitation Tournament was a single-elimination tournament of 32 NCAA Division I teams that were not selected to participate in the 2001 Women's NCAA tournament. It was the fourth edition of the postseason Women's National Invitation Tournament (WNIT).

The final four of the tournament paired Hawaii against New Mexico and Ohio State against James Madison. New Mexico beat Hawaii 68–43 and Ohio State took down James Madison 74–65.

Bracket
Visiting teams in first round are listed first. Games marked signify overtime. Source

West Regional bracket

South Regional bracket

East Regional bracket

Midwest Regional bracket

Semifinals and championship game

All-tournament team
Jame Lewis, Ohio State (MVP)
Courtney Coleman, Ohio State
Jordan Adams, New Mexico
Chelsea Grear, New Mexico
Janka Gabrielova, Hawaii
Shanna Price, Wisconsin–Green Bay

Source:

See also
 2001 NCAA Division I men's basketball tournament
 2001 NCAA Division I women's basketball tournament
 2001 National Invitation Tournament

References

Women's National Invitation Tournament
Women's National Invitation Tournament